The 1950 Houston Cougars football team was an American football team that represented the University of Houston as an independent during the 1950 college football season. In its third season under head coach Clyde Lee, the team compiled a 4–6 record. Bill Moeller and Max Clark were the team captains. The team played its home games at Public School Stadium in Houston.

Schedule

References

Houston
Houston Cougars football seasons
Houston Cougars football